Raman Sergeevich Salei (born February 27, 1994) is an Azerbaijani paralympic-swimmer of Belarusian origin. He represented Azerbaijan at the 2016 Summer Paralympic Games in Rio de Janeiro and the 2020 Summer Paralympic Games in Tokyo, winning three gold medals and one silver.

Biography
Roman Salei was born on February 27, 1994. In 2013, Salei's elder brother, Dzmitry Salei, decided to compete for Azerbaijan and Salei agreed to join him.

At the 2015 IPC Swimming World Championships in Glasgow, Scotland, Salei won the silver medal in the men's 50 m freestyle S12. The following year, at the 2016 Paralympic Games in Rio de Janeiro, Salei took silver in the 100 m backstroke S12. In recognition of his performance at the games, and for his contribution to the development of Azerbaijani sport, Salei was awarded the Order "For Service to the Fatherland" III degree by the President of Azerbaijan, Ilham Aliyev.

At the 2019 World Para Swimming Championships, Salei won silver in the 100 m backstroke S12 and bronze in the 50 m freestyle S12 and 100 m freestyle S12. He improved on this performance at the 2020 Summer Paralympics in Tokyo, winning gold in both the 100 metre freestyle S12 and 100 metre backstroke S12 events.

References

1994 births
Living people
Azerbaijani people of Belarusian descent
Azerbaijani sportspeople
Medalists at the 2016 Summer Paralympics
Medalists at the 2020 Summer Paralympics
Swimmers at the 2016 Summer Paralympics
Swimmers at the 2020 Summer Paralympics
Medalists at the World Para Swimming Championships
Paralympic medalists in swimming
Paralympic gold medalists for Azerbaijan
Paralympic silver medalists for Azerbaijan
Paralympic swimmers of Azerbaijan
Azerbaijani male freestyle swimmers
S12-classified Paralympic swimmers
21st-century Azerbaijani people